A Rural Elopement is a 1909 American silent short drama film directed by D. W. Griffith.

Cast
 Linda Arvidson as Cynthia Stebbins
 George Gebhardt as Hank Hopkins
 Harry Solter as Hungry Henry
 David Miles as Dad Stebbins
 John R. Cumpson as In Crowd
 Guy Hedlund
 Marion Leonard as In Crowd
 Owen Moore as In Crowd
 Mack Sennett as In Crowd

References

External links
 

1909 films
1909 drama films
Silent American drama films
American silent short films
American black-and-white films
Films directed by D. W. Griffith
1909 short films
1900s American films